Whitmer is a census-designated place (CDP) in Randolph County, West Virginia, United States. Whitmer had a post office, which closed on May 21, 2011. As of the 2010 census, its population was 106.

Notable person
Dewey L. Fleming, journalist and Pulitzer Prize recipient, was born in Whitmer.

References

Census-designated places in Randolph County, West Virginia
Census-designated places in West Virginia
Former municipalities in West Virginia